Daniel Darko (born ) is a Ghanaian male weightlifter, competing in the 62 kg category and representing Ghana at international competitions. He participated at the 2010 Commonwealth Games in the 62 kg event.

Major competitions

References

1986 births
Living people
Ghanaian male weightlifters
Weightlifters at the 2010 Commonwealth Games
Weightlifters at the 2014 Commonwealth Games
Commonwealth Games competitors for Ghana
Place of birth missing (living people)
20th-century Ghanaian people
21st-century Ghanaian people